Juan Fernando Giraldo Cárdenas (born 15 December 1998) is a Colombian footballer who currently plays as a midfielder for Jaguares de Cordoba.

Career statistics

Club

Notes

References

1998 births
Living people
Colombian footballers
Colombian expatriate footballers
Association football midfielders
Deportivo Cali footballers
Atlante F.C. footballers
Expatriate footballers in Mexico
Colombian expatriate sportspeople in Mexico
Sportspeople from Valle del Cauca Department